Audu is a Nigerian name that may refer to the following people:
Given name
Audu Bako (born 1924), Nigerian governor
Audu Bako School of Agriculture in Nigeria
Audu Innocent Ogbeh (born 1947), Nigerian politician 
Audu Idris Umar (born 1959), Nigerian senator 
Audu Maikori (born 1975), Nigerian lawyer, entrepreneur, social activist and public speaker
Audu Mohammed (born 1985), Nigerian football player

Surname
Abubakar Audu (1947–2015), Nigerian governor 
Ishaya Audu (1927–2005), Nigerian doctor and politician
Judith Audu, Nigerian film and television actress, presenter, model, blogger and movie producer
Musa Audu (born 1980), Nigerian sprinter 
Reine Audu, 18th century French fruit seller and revolutionary 
Seriki Audu (1991–2014), Nigerian football player